Going Home is an album by jazz drummer Elvin Jones recorded in 1992 and released on the Enja label.

Reception
The Allmusic review called the album "A welcome addition to Jones' extensive discography".

Track listing
All compositions by Elvin Jones except where noted
 "The Shell Game" - 12:05 
 "Going Home" - 4:54 
 "Cross Purpose" - 3:37 
 "You've Changed" (Bill Carey, Carl T. Fischer) - 8:38 
 "Truth" (Keiko Jones) - 11:56 
 "East of the Sun" (Brooks Bowman) - 4:03 
 "In 3/4 Thee" (Ravi Coltrane) - 6:39 
 "April 8th" - 7:51

Personnel
Elvin Jones  - drums 
Nicholas Payton - trumpet
Kent Jordan - flute, piccolo
Ravi Coltrane - soprano saxophone, tenor saxophone 
Javon Jackson - tenor saxophone
Willie Pickens - piano
Brad Jones - bass

References

Elvin Jones albums
1993 albums
Enja Records albums
Albums recorded at Van Gelder Studio